"After-birth abortion: why should the baby live?" is a controversial article published by Francesca Minerva and Alberto Giubilini in Journal of Medical Ethics in 2013 (available online from 2012) arguing to call child euthanasia "after-birth abortion" and highlighting similarities between abortion and euthanasia. The article attracted media attention and several scholarly critiques. According to Michael Tooley, "Very few philosophical publications, however, have evoked either more widespread attention, or emotionally more heated reactions, than this article has."

The argument of the article is as follows:
 Abortion is justified because of the moral status of foetuses (their shared status of 'potential persons' is not morally relevant)
 Abortion is justified when the foetus has severe abnormalities or would be an intolerable burden to its mother/family (at least when adoption is not a viable option due to not being in the best interests of actual persons)
 Newborns have the same moral status as foetuses (there are no morally relevant differences between them), if they suffer unbearably
 Newborns may be born with severe abnormalities (that cannot always be diagnosed before birth) and can be an intolerable burden on their mother/family (including when circumstances change after birth) 
 Therefore, "after-birth abortion" (euthanasia of newborns) can be justified in some circumstances

References

Academic freedom
2012 controversies
2013 controversies
Bioethics
Academic journal articles
Abortion debate